The Minister of Defense of Austria heads the Ministry of Defense.

First Austrian Republic 

* Partly as Chancellor or Vice-Chancellor.

Second Austrian Republic 

*Entrusted with continuation of the ministry

See also 
 Supreme Commander of the Imperial and Royal Armed Forces
 Minister of War (Austria-Hungary)
 Austrian Minister of Defence (Austria-Hungary)
 Ministry of Defense (Austria)
 Chief of the General Staff (Austria)

Notes

References

External links 
  Bundesministerium für Landesverteidigung Österreich
 Karl Lütgendorf (German) :de:Karl Lütgendorf

 
Defence